Siphluriscidae is a family of mayflies. It contains a single extant species, Siphluriscus chinensis, which is native to Vietnam and China. It is thought to be the most primitive living lineage of mayflies. A fossil genus, Stackelbergisca is known from several species from the Jurassic and Early Cretaceous of Asia. A second species of Siphluriscus, S. davidi was later assigned to the genus Siphlonurus.

Taxonomy 

 Siphluriscus Ulmer, 1920
 Siphluriscus chinensis Ulmer, 1920 China, Vietnam
 Stackelbergisca Tshernova 1967
 Stackelbergisca clara Sinitshenkova 2000 Doronino Formation, Russia, Early Cretaceous (Barremian)
 Stackelbergisca cylindrata Zhang 2006 Daohugou, China, Middle Jurassic
 Stackelbergisca shaburensis Sinitshenkova 1991 Ichetuy Formation, Russia, Late Jurassic (Oxfordian) 
 Stackelbergisca sibirica Tshernova 1967 Uda Formation, Russia, Late Jurassic (Oxfordian/Kimmeridgian)

References 

Mayflies
Insect families
Taxa described in 2003